The United Kingdom is the best location for wind power in Europe and one of the best in the world. By 2023, the UK had over 11 thousand wind turbines with a total installed capacity of 28gigawatts (GW): 14 GW onshore and 14 GW offshore, the sixth largest capacity of any country. Wind power generated about 25% of UK electricity, having surpassed coal in 2016 and nuclear in 2018. It is the largest source of renewable electricity in the UK.

From 2023 all windpower reduces the price of electricity: but in earlier years onshore wind built before the mid-2010s and offshore wind built before the late 2010s sometimes increased the price of electricity. Polling of public opinion consistently shows strong support for wind power in the UK, with nearly three-quarters of the population agreeing with its use, even for people living near onshore wind turbines.

The government has committed to a major expansion of offshore capacity to 50 GW by 2030, with 5GW from floating wind. One reason for this is to improve energy security.

History

The world's first electricity generating wind turbine was a battery charging machine installed in July 1887 by Scottish academic James Blyth to light his holiday home in Marykirk, Scotland. It was in 1951 that the first utility grid-connected wind turbine to operate in the United Kingdom was built by John Brown & Company in the Orkney Islands. In the 1970s, industrial scale wind generation was first proposed as an electricity source for the United Kingdom; the higher working potential of offshore wind was recognised with a capital cost per kilowatt estimated at £150 to £250.

In 2007 the United Kingdom Government agreed to an overall European Union target of generating 20% of the EU's energy supply from renewable sources by 2020. Each EU member state was given its own allocated target: for the United Kingdom it is 15%. This was formalised in January 2009 with the passage of the EU Renewables Directive. As renewable heat and renewable fuel production in the United Kingdom are at extremely low bases, RenewableUK estimated that this would require 35–40% of the United Kingdom's electricity to be generated from renewable sources by that date, to be met largely by 33–35gigawatts (GW) of installed wind capacity.

In December 2007, the Government announced plans for an expansion of wind energy in the United Kingdom, by conducting a Strategic Environmental Assessment of up to 25GW worth of wind farm offshore sites in preparation for a new round of development. These proposed sites were in addition to the 8GW worth of sites already awarded in the two earlier rounds of site allocations, Round1 in 2001 and Round2 in 2003. Taken together it was estimated that this would result in the construction of over 7,000 offshore wind turbines.

In 2010, 653MW of offshore wind came online.
The following year, only one offshore wind farm, phase1 of the Walney Wind Farm, was completed in 2011 with a capacity of 183MW.
On 28 December 2011 wind power set a then record contribution to the United Kingdom's demand for electricity of 12.2%.

2012 was a significant year for the offshore wind industry with 4large wind farms becoming operational with over 1.1GW of generating capability coming on stream.
In the year July 2012 to June 2013, offshore wind farms with a capacity of 1.463GW were installed, for the first time growing faster than onshore wind which grew by 1.258 GW.
The offshore wind industry continued to develop in 2013 with what was once the largest wind farm in the world, the London Array, becoming operational with over 630MW of generating capability coming on stream.

During 2013, 27.4TWh of energy was generated by wind power, which contributed 8.7% of the UK's electricity demand.

On 1 August 2013, Deputy Prime Minister Nick Clegg opened the Lincs Offshore Wind Farm. On commissioning the total capacity of wind power exceeded 10GW of installed capacity. 
In 2014, Prime Minister David Cameron said that people were "fed up" with wind turbines being built close to homes; onshore wind subsidies were removed and in 2015 planning rules changed to give local authorities strong controls on wind turbine development, greatly reducing onshore deployment.

During 2014, 28.1TWh of energy was generated by wind power (an average of 3.2GW, about 24% of the 13.5GW installed capacity at the time), which contributed 9.3% of the UK's electricity requirement.
In the same year, Siemens announced plans to build a £310million ($264million) facility for making offshore wind turbines in Paull, England, as Britain's wind power capacity rapidly expanded. Siemens chose the Hull area on the east coast of England because it is close to other large offshore projects planned in coming years. The new plant began producing turbine rotor blades in December 2016. The plant and the associated service centre, in Green Port Hull nearby, will employ about 1,000 workers.

During 2015, 40.4TW·h of energy was generated by wind power and the quarterly generation record was set in the three-month period from October to December 2015, with 13% of the nation's electricity demand met by wind. 2015 saw 1.2GW of new wind power capacity brought online, a 9.6%increase of the total UK installed capacity. Three large offshore wind farms came on stream in 2015,  Gwynt y Môr (576MW max. capacity), Humber Gateway (219MW) and Westermost Rough (210MW).

In 2016, the chief executive of DONG Energy (now known as Ørsted A/S), the UK's largest wind farm operator, predicted that wind power could supply more than half of the UK's electricity demand in the future. He pointed to the tumbling cost of green energy as evidence that wind and solar could supplant fossil fuels quicker than expected.

By 2020, climate change concerns led to greater public support for wind turbines, but despite government policy stating onshore wind is a "key building block" for electricity generation it was unclear if the 2015 onshore planning restrictions would be eased.  In 2022 three-quarters of the UK population supported further wind generated power in the UK and the majority would be happy for a wind farm to be built near them.

In 2022, wind generation in the UK exceeded 20 GW for the first time, reaching 20.9 GW between 1200h and 1230h on 2 November 2022. This was followed in 2023 with a record 21.6 GW on 10 January during a period of strong winds.

Wind farms

Offshore

The total offshore wind power capacity installed in the United Kingdom at the start of 2022 was 11.3GW.
The United Kingdom became the world leader of offshore wind power generation in October 2008 when it overtook Denmark.
In 2013, the 175-turbine London Array wind farm, located off the Kent coast, became the largest offshore wind farm in the world; this was surpassed in 2018 by the Walney 3 Extension.

The United Kingdom has been estimated to have over a third of Europe's total offshore wind resource, which is equivalent to three times the electricity needs of the nation at current rates of electricity consumption (In 2010 peak winter demand was 59.3GW, in summer it drops to about 45GW).
An estimate of the theoretical maximum potential of the United Kingdom's offshore wind resource in all waters to  depth gives the average power as 2200GW.

The first developments in United Kingdom offshore wind power came about through the now discontinued Non-Fossil Fuel Obligation (NFFO), leading to two wind farms, Blyth Offshore and Gunfleet sands. The NFFO was introduced as part of the Electricity Act 1989 and obliged United Kingdom electricity supply companies to secure specified amounts of electricity from non-fossil sources, which provided the initial spur for the commercial development of renewable energy in the United Kingdom.

Offshore wind projects completed in 20102011 had a levelised cost of electricity of £136/MWh, which fell to £131/MWh for projects completed in 2012–14 and £121/MWh for projects approved in 20122014; the industry hopes to get the cost down to £100/MWh for projects approved in 2020.

The construction price for offshore windfarms has fallen by almost a third since 2012 while technology improved and developers think a new generation of even larger turbines will enable yet more future cost reductions.  In 2017 the UK built 53% of the 3.15 GW European offshore wind farm capacity. In 2020, Boris Johnson pledged that, by the end of the decade, offshore wind would generate enough energy to power every UK home.

At the start of 2022 there was a total of 11.26 GW of installed offshore wind capacity.  During 2022 an additional 3.2 GW of capacity was added with the commissioning of the Moray East, Triton Knoll and Hornsea Project Two wind farms.  A further 13.6 GW of capacity is either under construction (Neart Na Gaoithe, Sofia, Seagreen & Doggerbank A) or has been awarded a Contract for Difference in Round 3 or Round 4.

Round 1

The result was a set of guidelines published in 1999, to build "development" farms designed to give developers a chance to gain technical and environmental experience. Locations were chosen by potential developers and a large number of applications were submitted. Seventeen of the applications were granted permission to proceed in April 2001, in what has become known as Round1 of United Kingdom offshore wind development.

The first of the Round 1 projects was North Hoyle Wind Farm, completed in December 2003. The final project, Teesside, was completed in August 2013. Twelve Round 1 farms in total are in operation providing a maximum power generating capacity of 1.2GW. Five sites were withdrawn, including the Shell Flat site off the coast of Lancashire.

Round 2

Lessons learnt from Round 1, particularly the difficulty in getting planning consent for offshore wind farms, together with the increasing pressure to reduce  emissions, prompted the then Department of Trade and Industry (DTI) to develop a strategic framework for the offshore wind industry. This identified three restricted areas for larger scale development, Liverpool Bay, the Thames Estuary and the area beyond the Wash, called the Greater Wash, in the North Sea. Development was prevented in an exclusion zone between 8 and 13km offshore to reduce visual impact and avoid shallow feeding grounds for sea birds. The new areas were tendered to prospective developers in a competitive bid process known as Round2. The results were announced in December 2003 with 15projects awarded with a combined power generating capacity of 7.2GW. By far the largest of these is the 900MW Triton Knoll. As before a full Environmental Impact Assessment (EIA) would be needed along with an application for planning consent.

The first of the Round 2 projects was Gunfleet Sands II, completed in April 2010 and six others are now operational including the London Array, formerly the largest wind farm in the world. Four other Round 2 sites are currently under construction.

Round 1 and 2 Extensions

In May 2010, the Crown Estate gave approval for seven Round 1 and 2 sites to be extended creating an additional 2GW of offshore wind capacity. Each wind farm extension will require a complete new planning application including an Environmental Impact Assessment and full consultation. The sites are:
 Burbo Bank and Walney: DONG Energy UK.
 Kentish Flats and Thanet: Vattenfall.
 Greater Gabbard: SSE Renewables and RWE Npower Renewables.
 Race Bank: Centrica Renewable Energy.
 Dudgeon: Statoil and Statkraft.

Round 3

Following on from the Offshore wind SEA announced by the Government in December 2007, the Crown Estate launched a third round of site allocations in June 2008. It followed the success of Rounds 1 and 2, from which important lessons were learnt; Round3 was on a much bigger scale than the combined total of its predecessors (Rounds1 and 2 allocated 8GW of sites, while Round 3 alone could identify up to 25GW).

The Crown Estate proposed nine offshore zones, within which a number of individual wind farms would be situated. It ran a competitive tender process to award leases to consortia of potential developers. The bidding closed in March 2009 with over 40applications from companies and consortia and multiple tenders for each zone. The successful bidders were announced on 8 January 2010.

Following the allocation of zones, individual planning applications still had to be sought by developers. The first zone came on stream in 2018; several more have still to be completed, and some have been abandoned (see below).

Round 3 consortia
During the bidding process there was considerable speculation over which companies had bid for the zones. The Crown Estate did not make the list public and most of the consortia also remained silent. The successful bidders for each zone were eventually announced as follows:

In 2009, during the Round 3 initial proposal stage 26.7GW of potential capacity was planned. However, due to government planning permission refusal, challenging ground conditions and project financing issues, a number of proposed sites were withdrawn. A number of other sites were also reduced in scope.

Round 4 
Round 4 was announced in 2019 and represented the first large scale new leasing round in a decade. This offers the opportunity for up to 7GW of new offshore capacity to be developed in the waters around England and Wales. This is split into four bidding areas:

 Dogger Bank 
 Eastern Regions 
 South East
 Northern Wales and Irish Sea

The tenders are under review and the Agreements for Lease will be announced in Autumn 2021.
In February 2021, four winners for almost 8GW were found, mostly new entries. Option fees were introduced this time, with clearing prices ranging from £76,203 (US$105,022) per megawatt year to £154,000 (US$212,241) for sites ranging from 480MW to 1.5GW. The Crown Estate will be collecting annual revenues of around £880million until the sites reach FID or for a maximum of 10 years.

Future plans 
The UK has accelerated its decommissioning of coal power stations aiming for a 2024 phase-out date, and recent British nuclear power stations have encountered significant technical issues and project overruns that have resulted in significant increases in project costs. 
These issues have resulted in new UK nuclear projects failing to secure project financing. Similarly, SMR technology is not currently economically competitive with offshore wind in the UK. Following the Fukushima nuclear disaster public support for new nuclear has fallen. 
In response, the UK government increased its previous commitment for 40GW of Offshore wind capacity by 2030.
As of 2020, this represents a 355% increase over current capacity in 10 years. It is expected the Crown Estate will announce multiple new leasing Rounds and increases to existing bidding areas throughout the 20202030 period to achieve the government's aim of 40GW.

Scottish offshore

In addition to the 25GW scoped under the Round 3 SEA, the Scottish Government and the Crown Estate also called for bids on potential sites within Scottish territorial waters. These were originally considered as too deep to provide viable sites, but 17companies submitted tenders and the Crown Estate initially signed exclusivity agreements with 9companies for 6GW worth of sites. Following publication of the Scottish Government's sectoral marine plan for offshore wind energy in Scottish territorial waters in March 2010, six sites were given approval subject to securing detailed consent. Subsequently, 4sites have been granted agreements for lease.

The complete list of sites including power updates and developer name changes:

In 2022 Crown Estate announced the outcome of its application process for ScotWind Leasing, the first Scottish offshore wind leasing round in over a decade and the first ever since the management of offshore wind rights were devolved to Scotland. 17 projects were selected with a capacity of 25 GW.

List of operational and proposed offshore wind farms

Onshore

The first commercial wind farm was built in 1991 at Delabole in Cornwall; it consisted of 10turbines each with a capacity to generate a maximum of 400kW. Following this, the early 1990s saw a small but steady growth with half a dozen farms becoming operational each year; the larger wind farms tended to be built on the hills of Wales, examples being Rhyd-y-Groes, Llandinam, Bryn Titli and Carno. Smaller farms were also appearing on the hills and moors of Northern Ireland and England. The end of 1995 saw the first commercial wind farm in Scotland go into operation at Hagshaw Hill. The late 1990s saw sustained growth as the industry matured. In 2000, the first turbines capable of generating more than 1MW were installed and the pace of growth started to accelerate as the larger power companies like Scottish Power and Scottish & Southern became increasingly involved in order to meet legal requirements to generate a certain amount of electricity using renewable means (see Renewables obligations below). Wind turbine development continued rapidly and by the mid-2000s 2MW+ turbines were the norm. In 2007, the German wind turbine producer Enercon installed the first 6MW model ("E-126"); The nameplate capacity was changed from 6MW to 7   MW after technical revisions were performed in 2009 and to 7.5   MW in 2010.

Growth continued with bigger farms and larger, more efficient turbines sitting on taller and taller masts. Scotland's sparsely populated, hilly and windy countryside became a popular area for developers and the United Kingdom's first 100MW+ farm went operational in 2006 at Hadyard Hill in South Ayrshire. 2006 also saw the first use of the 3MW turbine. In 2008, the largest onshore wind farm in England was completed on Scout Moor and the repowering of the Slieve Rushen Wind Farm created the largest farm in Northern Ireland. In 2009, the largest wind farm in the United Kingdom went live at Whitelee on Eaglesham Moor in Scotland. This is a 539MW wind farm consisting of 215turbines. Approval has been granted to build several more 100MW+ wind farms on hills in Scotland and will feature 3.6MW turbines.

As of September 2013, there were 458 operational onshore wind farms in the United Kingdom with a total of 6565MW of nameplate capacity. A further 1564MW of capacity is currently being constructed, while another 4.8GW of schemes have planning consent.

In 2009, United Kingdom onshore wind farms generated 7,564GW·h of electricity; this represents a 2% contribution to the total United Kingdom electricity generation (378.5TW·h).

Large onshore wind farms are usually directly connected to the National Grid, but smaller wind farms are connected to a regional distribution network, termed "embedded generation". In 2009 nearly half of wind generation capacity was embedded generation, but this is expected to reduce in future years as larger wind farms are built.

Gaining planning permission for onshore wind farms continues to prove difficult, with many schemes stalled in the planning system and a high rate of refusal. The RenewableUK (formerly BWEA) figures show that there are approximately 7,000MW worth of onshore schemes waiting for planning permission. On average, a wind farm planning application takes two years to be considered by a local authority, with an approval rate of 40%. This compares extremely unfavourably with other types of major applications, such as housing, retail outlets and roads, 70% of which are decided within the 13- to 16-week statutory deadline; for wind farms the rate is just 6%.
Approximately half of all wind farm planning applications, over 4GW worth of schemes, have objections from airports and traffic control on account of their impact on radar. In 2008 NATS en Route, the BWEA, the Ministry of Defence and other government departments signed a Memorandum of Understanding seeking to establish a mechanism for resolving objections and funding for more technical research.

This planning criteria has stunted the development of onshore wind in the UK.

List of the largest operational and proposed onshore wind farms

Economics

Subsidies and taxes 
From 2002 to 2015, windfarms were subsidised through the Renewables Obligation where British electricity suppliers were required by law to provide a proportion of their sales from renewable sources such as wind power or pay a penalty fee. The supplier then received Renewable Obligation Certificates (ROC) for each MW·h of electricity they have purchased. The Energy Act 2008 introduced banded ROCs for different technologies from April 2009. Onshore wind receives 1ROC per MWh, but since the Renewables Obligation Banding Review in 2009, offshore wind has received 2ROCs to reflect its higher costs of generation. In Northern Ireland, a banding of 4 ROCs is available for small onshore turbines.

Wind energy received approximately 40% of the total revenue generated by the Renewables Obligation, and ROCs provided over half of the revenue of the wind farms involved.  The total annual cost of the Renewables Obligation reached £6.3billion in 2019–20, of which 67% was for wind power. This cost was added to end-user electricity bills. Sir David King warned that this could increase UK levels of fuel poverty.

The government closed the Renewables Obligation to new onshore wind power projects in 2016.  Support for offshore wind was moved into the government's Contract for Difference (CfD) regime. Support for wind power under this programme rose to £1.7billion in 2020, with £1.6billion of that total shared between six offshore windfarms.

In 2023 there is an effective windfall tax.

Costs 
The economics of wind power are driven by factors such as the capital, operating and finance costs, as well as the operational performance or capacity factor. These factors are in turn affected by issues such as location, turbine size and spacing and, for offshore windfarms, water depth and distance from shore. Operating costs and performance change over a windfarm's life, and several years of data are required before an assessment of the trajectory of these figures can be made.

A review of financial accounts published by the Renewable Energy Foundation in 2020 showed that UK offshore windfarm capital costs rose steadily from 2002 to around 2013, before stabilising and perhaps falling slightly. Operating costs have risen steadily up to the time of the study, but financing costs have fallen. This picture has been confirmed by a comprehensive review of audited accounts data for UK offshore windfarms, which found that levelised costs rose from around £60–70/MWh for early projects, to around £140–160/MWh by 2010–13, before stabilising.

The Renewable Energy Foundation study also examined onshore wind costs, finding that capital costs had risen to around 2011 before declining slightly thereafter, while operating costs had risen steadily. Estimates of the levelised cost of UK onshore wind are older. A 2011 study by the engineering consultancy Mott MacDonald put onshore wind costs at £83/MWh, below new nuclear at £96/MWh.

Auction bids
In the UK's contract for difference auctions of 2017 and 2019, offshore windfarms made bids to supply the grid at strike prices much lower than anything seen before: £57.50/MWh in the 2017 auction and £39.65/MWh in the 2019 one. These values are below the ostensible windfarm costs outlined in the previous section, and have therefore been widely taken as evidence of a fundamental change in the economics of offshore wind power; in other words that technological advances have led to much lower costs.

There has been no similar reduction in bidding prices from onshore windfarms. The lowest successful bid under the CfD regime has been £79.99/MWh.

Effects on electricity price 
The building of UK wind farms has been supported through the Renewables Obligation and, since 2016, by price guarantee support through the Contracts for Difference regime too. The 2018 levelised cost of electricity (LCOE) of offshore wind was in the range £100–150/MWh.  However, in recent CfD auctions, strike prices as low as £39.65/MWh have been agreed for offshore wind projects, which has led to an assumption that there has been an equivalent reduction in the underlying costs.  Due to the structure of the contract for difference arrangements wind generators pay the government when power prices exceed the strike price. Wholesale power prices averaged £57/MWh in 2018 and £113/MWh in 2021 before spiking above £400/MWh in 2022.

Offshore wind has historically been more expensive than onshore wind, but in 2016 it was predicted that it would have the lowest levelised cost of electricity in the United Kingdom in 2020 when a carbon cost was applied to generating technologies. In the 2022 AR4 CFD auction, offshore wind cleared at an average price of £37.35/MWh versus onshore winds average price of £42.47/MWh (both 2012 prices).

Historically, wind power had raised costs of electricity slightly. In 2015, it was estimated that the use of wind power in the UK had added £18 to the average yearly electricity bill. This was the additional cost to consumers of using wind to generate about 9.3% of the annual total (see table below) – about £2 for each 1%.

Actual cost performance 
A statistical and econometric analysis of a majority of onshore and offshore windfarms built in the United Kingdom since 2002 with a capacity of more than 10MW has been performed by a former professor of the School of Economics at the University of Edinburgh on behalf of an anti wind power organisation. It finds that the actual cost of onshore and offshore wind generation has not fallen significantly. Rather, capital and operating costs per MW have increased, the latter driven by higher than expected frequency of equipment failure and preventative maintenance associated with new generations of larger turbines. The study concludes that, after current contracts guaranteeing above-market prices expire, expected revenues from generation will be less than operating cost. If confirmed, this would require financial regulators to impose heavy risk weightings on loans to offshore wind farm operators, effectively making them too risky for pension funds and small investors.

Variability and related issues

Wind-generated power is a variable resource, and the amount of electricity produced at any given point in time by a given plant will depend on wind speeds, air density and turbine characteristics (among other factors). If wind speed is too low (less than about 2.5m/s) then the wind turbines will not be able to make electricity, and if it is too high (more than about 25m/s) the turbines will have to be shut down to avoid damage. When this happens other power sources must have the capacity to meet demand, Three reports on the wind variability in the United Kingdom issued in 2009, generally agree that variability of the wind does not make the grid unmanageable; and the additional costs, which are modest, can be quantified. For wind power market penetration of up to 20% studies in the UK show a cost of £3-5/MWh. In the United Kingdom, demand for electricity is higher in winter than in summer and so are wind speeds.

While the output from a single turbine can vary greatly and rapidly as local wind speeds vary, as more turbines are connected over larger and larger areas the average power output becomes less variable. Studies by Graham Sinden suggest that, in practice, the variations in thousands of wind turbines, spread out over several different sites and wind regimes, are smoothed, rather than intermittent. As the distance between sites increases, the correlation between wind speeds measured at those sites, decreases.

The 2021 United Kingdom natural gas supplier crisis increased electricity prices, which were further worsened by rising demand amidst a lack of wind. During storms, power prices have occasionally become zero or even negative.

Constraint payments
The development of the GB grid was characterised by the close proximity of major sources and demand for electricity. Since wind farms tend to be sited far from centres of demand, transmission capacity can be inadequate to deliver electricity to users, particularly when wind speeds are high. When the grid cannot deliver electricity generated, wind farm operators are paid to switch off. It is normally necessary to pay another generator – normally a gas-fired power station –  on the other side of the constraint to switch on as well, to ensure that demand is met. These two incentives are referred to as "constraint payments" or curtailment, and they are one source of criticism of the use of wind power and its implementation; in 2011 it was estimated that nearly £10million in constraint payments would be received, representing ten times the value of the potential lost electricity generation. Wind farm constraint payments have increased substantially year on year, £224million, out of a total of £409million in 2020–21. In addition, £582million was spent rebalancing the system afterwards, mainly to gas-fired power stations.

Backup and Frequency Response
There is some dispute over the necessary amount of reserve or backup required to support the large-scale use of wind and solar energy due to the variable nature of its supply. In a 2008 submission to the House of Lords Economic Affairs Committee, E.ON UK argued that it is necessary to have up to 80–90% backup. Other studies give a requirement of 15% to 22% of installed intermittent capacity. National Grid, which has responsibility for balancing the grid, reported in June 2009 that the electricity distribution grid could cope with on-off wind energy without spending a lot on backup, but only by rationing electricity at peak times using a so-called "smart grid", developing increased energy storage technology and increasing interconnection with the rest of Europe.  In June 2011, several energy companies including Centrica told the government that 17 gas-fired plants costing £10billion would be needed by 2020 to act as back-up generation for wind. However, as they would be standing idle for much of the time they would require "capacity payments" to make the investment economic, on top of the subsidies already paid for wind. In 20152016, National Grid contracted 10 coal and gas-fired plants to keep spare capacity on standby for all generation modes, at a cost of £122million, which represented 0.3% of an average electricity bill.

Grid scale battery storage is being developed in order to cope with the variability in wind and solar power. , 1.3GW of grid storage batteries was active, along with the traditional 2.5 GW of pumped storage at Dinorwig, Cruachan and Ffestiniog.

With the increase in proportion of energy being generated by wind and solar on the UK grid, there is a significant reduction in synchronous generation. Therefore, in order to ensure grid stability, the National grid ESO is piloting a range of demand side and supply side frequency response products.

Public opinion 
Surveys of public attitudes across Europe and in many other countries show strong public support for wind power. About 80 per cent of EU citizens support wind power.

A 2003 survey of residents living around Scotland's 10 existing wind farms found high levels of community acceptance and strong support for wind power, with much support from those who lived closest to the wind farms. The results of this survey support those of an earlier Scottish Executive survey 'Public attitudes to the Environment in Scotland 2002', which found that the Scottish public would prefer the majority of their electricity to come from renewables and which rated wind power as the cleanest source of renewable energy. A survey conducted in 2005 showed that 74% of people in Scotland agree that wind farms are necessary to meet current and future energy needs. When people were asked the same question in a Scottish renewables study conducted in 2010, 78% agreed. The increase is significant as there were twice as many wind farms in 2010 as there were in 2005. The 2010 survey also showed that 52% disagreed with the statement that wind farms are "ugly and a blot on the landscape". 59% agreed that wind farms were necessary and that how they looked was unimportant. Scotland is planning to obtain 100% of electricity from renewable sources by 2020.

A British 2015 survey showed 68% support and 10% opposition to onshore wind farms.

Politics
In the UK, the ruling Conservative government was previously opposed to further onshore wind turbines and cancelled subsidies for new onshore wind turbines from April 2016. The former prime minister David Cameron stated that "We will halt the spread of onshore wind farms", and claimed that "People are fed up with onshore wind" though polls of public opinion showed the converse. Leo Murray of Possible (formerly 10:10 Climate Action) said, "It looks increasingly absurd that the Conservatives have effectively banned Britain's cheapest source of new power." As the UK's Conservative government was opposed to onshore wind power it attempted to cancel existing subsidies for onshore wind turbines a year early from April 2016, although the House of Lords struck those changes down.

The wind power industry has claimed that the policy will increase electricity prices for consumers as onshore wind is one of the cheapest power technologies, although the government disputes this, and it is estimated that 2,500 turbines will not now be built. Questions have been raised about whether the country will now meet its renewable obligations, as Committee on Climate Change has stated that 25GW of onshore wind may be needed by 2030.

In 2020, the Boris Johnson-led government decided to stop the block on onshore wind power, and since December 2021 onshore wind developers have been able to compete in subsidy auctions with solar power and offshore wind. On 24 September 2020, Boris Johnson reaffirmed his commitment to renewables, especially wind power and nuclear in the United Kingdom. He said that the UK can be the "Saudi Arabia of wind power", and that

Records
December 2014 was a record breaking month for UK wind power. A total of 3.90TWh of electricity was generated in the month – supplying 13.9% of the UK's electricity demand.
On 19 October 2014, wind power supplied just under 20% of the UK's electrical energy that day. Additionally, as a result of eight of 16 nuclear reactors being offline for maintenance or repair, wind produced more energy than nuclear did that day.
The week starting 16 December 2013, wind generated a record 783,886MWh – providing 13% of Britain's total electricity needs that week.
And on 21 December, a record daily amount of electricity was produced with 132,812MWh generated, representing 17% of the nation's total electricity demand on that day.

In January 2018 metered wind power peaked at over 10GW and contributed up to a peak of 42% of the UK's total electricity supply. In March, maximum wind power generation reached 14GW, meaning nearly 37% of the nation's electricity was generated by wind power operating at over 70% capacity. On 5 December 2019, maximum wind power generation reached 15.6GW. At around 2am on 1 July 2019, wind power was producing 50.64% of the electricity supply, perhaps the first time that over half of the UK's electricity was produced by wind, while at 2:00 am on 8 February 2019, wind power was producing 56.05% of the electricity supply. Wind power first exceeded 16GW on 8 December 2019 during Storm Atiyah.

On Boxing Day 2020, a record 50.67% of energy used in the United Kingdom was generated by wind power. However, it was not the highest daily amount of energy ever generated by wind turbines; that came earlier in December 2020, when demand was higher than on Boxing Day and wind turbines supplied 40% of the energy required by the National Grid (17.3GW). However, on 26 August 2020, wind briefly contributed 59.9% of the grids electricity mix.

In 2022 a new record was set on 24 May with maximum wind power generation reaching 19.916GW. Then on 2 November wind generation reached 20.896 GW, providing 53% of Britain’s electricity between 12:00pm and 12:30pm.

10 January 2023 saw 21.620 GW of generation, the first time over 21 GW had been produced by wind power in the UK.

Manufacturing
As of 2020, there were no major UK-based wind turbine manufacturers: most are headquartered in Denmark, Germany and the USA.

In 2014, Siemens announced plans to build facilities for offshore wind turbines in Kingston upon Hull, England, as Britain's wind power rapidly expands. The new plant was expected to begin producing turbine rotor blades in 2016. By 2019, blades were being shipped in large numbers. The plant and the associated service centre, in Green Port Hull nearby, will employ about 1,000 workers. The facilities will serve the UK market, where the electricity that major power producers generate from wind grew by about 38 per cent in 2013, representing about 6 per cent of total electricity, according to government figures. At the time there were plans to continue to increase Britain's wind-generating capacity, to 14GW by 2020. In fact, that figure was exceeded in late 2015.

On 16 October 2014, TAG Energy Solutions announced the mothballing and semi closure of its Haverton Hill construction base near Billingham with between 70 and 100 staff redundancies after failing to secure any subsequent work following the order for 16 steel foundations for the Humber Estuary in East Yorkshire.

In June 2016, Global Energy Group announced it had signed a contract in association with Siemens to fabricate and assemble turbines for the Beatrice Wind Farm, at its Nigg Energy Park site. It hopes in the future to become a centre for excellence and has opened a skills academy to help re-train previous offshore workers for green energy projects.

During 2021, £900M were invested in UK offshore wind power manufacturing. The UK offshore wind industry occupied 19,600 people directly in 2021, while thousands others worked in related businesses.

Specific regions

Wind power in Scotland

Wind power is Scotland's fastest growing renewable energy technology, with 5328 MW of installed capacity as of March 2015. This includes 5131 MWof onshore wind and 197MW of offshore wind.

Whitelee Wind Farm near Eaglesham, East Renfrewshire is the largest onshore wind farm in the United Kingdom with 215 Siemens and Alstom wind turbines and a total capacity of 539MW. Clyde Wind Farm near Abington, South Lanarkshire is the UK's second largest onshore wind farm comprising 152 turbines with a total installed capacity of 350MW. There are many other large onshore wind farms in Scotland, at various stages of development, including some that are in community ownership.

Robin Rigg Wind Farm in the Solway Firth is Scotland's only commercial-scale, operational offshore wind farm. Completed in 2010, the farm comprises 60 Vestas turbines with a total installed capacity of 180MW. Scotland is also home to two offshore wind demonstration projects: The two turbine, 10 MW Beatrice Demonstrator Project located in the Moray Firth, has led to construction of the 84 turbine, 588MW Beatrice Wind Farm set to begin in 2017 and the single turbine, 7MW Fife Energy Park Offshore Demonstration Wind Turbine in the Firth of Forth. There are also several other commercial-scale and demonstration projects in the planning stages.

The siting of turbines is often an issue, but multiple surveys have shown high local community acceptance for wind power in Scotland. There is further potential for expansion, especially offshore given the high average wind speeds, and a number of large offshore wind farms are planned.

The Scottish Government has achieved its target of generating 50% of Scotland's electricity from renewable energy by 2015, and is hoping to achieve 100% by 2020. Renewables produced 97.4% of Scotland's net electricity in 2020, mostly from wind power.

In July 2017 work commissioning an experimental floating wind farm known as Hywind at Peterhead began. The wind farm is expected to supply power to 20,000 homes. Manufactured by Statoil, the floating turbines can be located in water up to a kilometre deep. In its first two years of operation the facility with five floating wind turbines, giving a total installed capacity of 30MW, has averaged a capacity factor in excess of 50%

King Charles and the royal family
In 2023, through a great increase in profits from six new wind farms, King Charles stated that he would rather see the profits from the wind farms go to support the "wider public good" instead of the profits going to support the royal family.

See also
 Related lists

 Lists of offshore wind farms by country
 Lists of offshore wind farms by water area
 Lists of wind farms by country
 List of power stations in Scotland#Wind power
 List of wind turbine manufacturers

 Related United Kingdom pages

 Renewable energy in the United Kingdom
 Renewable energy in Scotland
 Solar power in the United Kingdom
 Geothermal power in the United Kingdom
 Biofuel in the United Kingdom
 Hydroelectricity in the United Kingdom
 Energy in the United Kingdom
 Energy use and conservation in the United Kingdom
 Energy policy of the United Kingdom
 Green electricity in the United Kingdom

 Developers and operators

 Baywind Energy Co-operative
 Centrica
 DONG Energy
 Ecotricity
 EDF
 Good Energy
 REG WindPower
 RWE npower
 SSE
 Talisman Energy
 Vattenfall
 Westmill Wind Farm Co-operative

 Other related

 Environmental impact of wind power
 Friends of the Earth
 Cost of electricity by source
 Renewable Electricity and the Grid
 Renewable energy in the European Union
 Renewable energy by country
 United Kingdom National Renewable Energy Action Plan
 Special Protection Area

References

Further reading
Bassi, Samuela; Bowen, Alex; Fankhauser, Sam (June 2012). The case for and against onshore wind energy in the UK. The Grantham Research Institute on Climate Change and the Environment.

External links

 4C Offshore's Wind Farm Map and Database containing all UK offshore wind farms.
 COWRIE Collaborative offshore wind research into the environment
 RenewableUK Press Release 2015 Record Year
 The Renewable Energy Centre Wind Power in the UK.
 yes 2 wind UK wind farm supporters organisation
 Windfarm Action Group UK wind farm critics organisation
 A Sea Change: The Wind Farm Revolution
 Grants for wind power/turbines
 The Crown Estate Invests in 25 GW of Offshore Wind Power
 UK plans big wind power expansion
 UK Group Plans to Cut the Costs of Offshore Wind
 LORC Offshore Renewables Map for UK
 Electricity generation in the UK by type. Near live. 30 minutes
 State of the Wind Turbine Insurance Market in the UK (2013) 

Electric power generation in the United Kingdom
 
Wikipedia articles in need of updating from December 2016